The Ambrose Lincoln Jr. House is a historic house located at 1916 Bay Street in Taunton, Massachusetts.

Description and history 
It was built in about 1775 by Ambrose Lincoln Jr., a farmer, shortly after his marriage. The house remained in the Lincoln family until it was sold to William Austin in 1919.

The Federal Period, two-story I-house has a hipped roof with a five-bay wide façade is entered through a central doorway with a louvered fanlight set in a key-stoned, molded surround. The structure features two interior end chimneys.

It was added to the National Register of Historic Places on July 5, 1984.

See also
National Register of Historic Places listings in Taunton, Massachusetts
North Taunton Baptist Church

References

National Register of Historic Places in Taunton, Massachusetts
Houses completed in 1775
Houses in Taunton, Massachusetts
Houses on the National Register of Historic Places in Bristol County, Massachusetts
Federal architecture in Massachusetts